Belleville Aerodrome  is a private airport located  east of Belleville, Ontario, Canada. The Belleville Aerodrome was established in 1961 by businessman James Marker, who also invented the Cheezies snack food.

The airport is accessed by a private driveway off Airport Parkway behind a strawberry farm.

References

Registered aerodromes in Ontario
Transport in Belleville, Ontario
Buildings and structures in Hastings County

pms:Belleville Airport